The Te Rapa cogeneration plant is a 44 MW cogeneration plant owned and operated by Contact Energy.  It is located at the Fonterra dairy factory at Te Rapa near Hamilton in New Zealand and was commissioned in 1999.

The construction of the plant came as part of a wider upgrade to the dairy factory proposed in 1997. The plant was originally planned to be 150MW, but objections from Greenpeace, Tainui and other parties about the environmental impacts and carbon dioxide emissions managed to agree to reduce the size of the plant. The Waikato Times reported that “Greenpeace was pleased but said even the smaller plant would pump out 100,000 tonnes of carbon dioxide”.

The plant is based on a gas turbine (a GE frame 6B) that can produce up to 44 MW of electricity.  Hot exhaust gases from the turbine are ducted to a heat recovery steam generator (HRSG) to raise steam.  The HRSG has duct burners to increase steam output, which can be up to 180 tons of steam per hour.

The cogeneration plant is designed for flexible operation, and can provide electricity to the dairy factory, export electricity to the local network or import electricity for use in the dairy factory.  A common operating mode is 30 MW of electricity exported and 15 MW plus 120 tons per hour of steam provided to the dairy factory.

A 127 MW gas/diesel fired auxiliary boiler is used when the cogeneration plant is not in operation.

Fonterra has been authorized by the Waikato Regional Council to install and commission an alternative combustion plant if the co-generation plant ceases to be available.

Planned closing

On 21 June 2022 Contact Energy announced that it would be closing the gas turbine by June 2023 when their contract to supply Fonterra with electricity expires. Mr Fuge, the CEO of Contact Energy said that "The gap in generation created by the closure of Te Rapa next year will be replaced by new, renewable generation that is set to come on stream over the coming years,"

References

External links
 Pont Consultants
 Pont Consultants image

Natural gas-fired power stations in New Zealand
Buildings and structures in Hamilton, New Zealand
Fonterra